Taledanda is a 2021 Kannada-language Indian film directed by Praveen Krupakar starring Sanchari Vijay in the lead role. Director Praveen Krupakar said that 'actor Vijay deserves a national award for Taledanda', who died from a motorcycle crash in 2021.

The film premiered at the 2021 International Film Festival of India and continued to show at other film festivals.

Summary
Taledanda is the story of Kunnegowda (Kunna), a boy who is fond of trees and plants.

Cast
Sanchari Vijay as Kunne Gowda "Kunna"
Mangala N. as Kethamma
B. Suresha as Prof. Prakruthi
Ramesh Pandit as Jademada
Mandya Ramesh as MLA Doddaranga
Chaitra Achar as Saaki
Bhavani Prakash as Niveditha
Sparsha Shenoy as Prakruthi maathe
Rajesh S. Rao as Dr. Pai

References

External links
 

2021 films
2020s Kannada-language films